Park Kyung Ah (born ) was a South Korean female artistic gymnast, representing her nation at international competitions.

She participated at the 2004 Summer Olympics, and the 2003 World Artistic Gymnastics Championships.

References

External links
http://hosted.ap.org/olympics/2004/GAW008.html
http://www.voanews.com/a/a-13-a-2004-08-18-36-1/293083.html
http://www.gymmedia.com/Anaheim03/appa/partic_wom.pdf
http://www.gymmedia.de/Athens04/artistic_en/AGwom-partic.pdf
https://usagym.org/PDFs/Results/w_03worlds_eventqual.pdf
http://www.fig-photos.com/images/athens2004-park-kyung-ah-kor-110523828
 http://www.santabanta.com/gallery/sports/olympic-2004/koreas-kyung-ah-park-vaults-during-the-womens-ar/7824/

1986 births
Living people
South Korean female artistic gymnasts
Place of birth missing (living people)
Gymnasts at the 2004 Summer Olympics
Olympic gymnasts of South Korea
Gymnasts at the 2002 Asian Games
Asian Games competitors for South Korea
21st-century South Korean women